Hérédougou is a village in the Pâ Department of Balé Province in south-western Burkina Faso. The village has a population of 957.

References

Populated places in the Boucle du Mouhoun Region
Balé Province